Felipe Rodríguez Chacartegui (born 23 February 1998), is a Spanish professional footballer who plays for UCAM Murcia CF as a left back.

Club career
Born in Cádiz, Andalusia, Chacartegui started his career with Polideportivo Cádiz and AD Tiempo Libre before joining San Fernando CD in 2013. On 8 December 2014, aged only 16, he made his senior – and first team – debut by coming on as a second-half substitute in a 2–2 Tercera División home draw against Algeciras CF.

Chacartegui subsequently appeared rarely for the B-side in the regional leagues while also playing for the main squad. On 16 May 2015 he scored his first senior goal, netting his team's second in a 4–1 home routing of La Palma CF.

On 13 July 2015, Chacartegui moved to Sevilla FC, returning to the youth setup. On 1 September 2017, after already representing the C-team, he signed a new two-year deal with the club, being immediately promoted to the reserves in Segunda División and being assigned the number 12 jersey.

Chacartegui made his professional debut on 4 February 2018, starting in a 0–1 home loss against SD Huesca. On 28 July 2020, he signed for Segunda División B side UCAM Murcia CF.

Personal life
Felipe's grandfather, Javier, was also a footballer. A midfielder, he represented Cádiz CF in the 1960s.

References

External links

1998 births
Living people
Footballers from Cádiz
Spanish footballers
Association football defenders
Segunda División players
Segunda División B players
Tercera División players
Sevilla FC C players
Sevilla Atlético players
UCAM Murcia CF players